Stacy Leigh Bishop (born May 1, 1985) is an American former college and professional soccer midfielder who last played for Atlanta Beat of Women's Professional Soccer.

Early years 

Bishop was born in Katy, Texas.  She grew up in Land o' Lakes, Florida, and attended Land o' Lakes High School.  She played for the Land o' Lakes Gators high school soccer team, and received Class 2A first-team all-state honors in 2001, 2002 and 2003.  She led her team to the Class 2A state championship in 2003, and was named the Class 2A state player of the year.  Bishop holds the Pasco County career scoring record with 192 goals.

College career 

Bishop accepted an athletic scholarship to attend Louisiana State University in Baton Rouge, Louisiana, where she played for the LSU Lady Tigers soccer team in 2003 and 2004.  After her sophomore year, she transferred to the University of Florida in Gainesville, Florida and had to sit out the 2005 season due to transfer rules. She played for coach Becky Burleigh's Florida Gators women's soccer team in 2006 and 2007.  Bishop was recognized as a first-team All-American and a Mac Hermann semi-finalist (top player in the country) in 2006.  In both 2006 and 2007, she was an Academic All-American and a first-team All-Southeastern Conference (SEC) selection.  Bishop graduated from the University of Florida with a bachelor's degree in health education in December 2007.

Club career 
Bishop played for the Central Florida Krush, a W-League franchise based in Winter Park, Florida in 2005–2006. The W-League allows college players the opportunity to play alongside established international players while maintaining their collegiate eligibility. In 2007, Bishop played for the W-League Jersey Sky Blue and in 2008 she played for the W-League Tampa Bay Hellenic.

In 2009, Bishop signed with the Boston Breakers, but was released on June 18, 2009 after making nine appearances for them.  She then played for five games for Tampa Bay Hellenic of the W-League before being re-signed by Boston Breakers on July 17, 2009 and made one further appearance (34 minutes) for the club on July 19, 2009 against FC Gold Pride.  At the conclusion of the 2009 Women's Professional Soccer season, she was released by the team.  Bishop was signed by the Atlanta Beat for the 2010 WPS season.  She appeared in every game for the Beat in 2010 and was top 5 in minutes played.

References

External links 
 Women's Professional Soccer player profile
 Tampa Bay Hellenic player profile
 Florida player profile
 LSU player profile

1985 births
Living people
Women's association football midfielders
Boston Breakers players
LSU Tigers women's soccer players
Florida Gators women's soccer players
People from Land o' Lakes, Florida
American women's soccer players
Atlanta Beat (WPS) players
Soccer players from Florida
Sportspeople from Hillsborough County, Florida
USL W-League (1995–2015) players
Women's Professional Soccer players
Tampa Bay Hellenic players